Shoulder of Mutton Green is a public open space in Welling in the London Borough of Bexley. It lies between Wickham Street and Bellegrove Road, which is part of the old London to Dover Road. It owes its unusual name to its triangular shape. Before the urban growth of the nearby hamlet of Welling in the early 20th century, Shoulder of Mutton Green was surrounded by fields.

References 

Common land in London
Parks and open spaces in the London Borough of Bexley